The 2007–08 EDF Energy Cup was the 37th season of England's national rugby union cup competition, and the third to follow the recently adopted Anglo-Welsh format.

As in the previous two years, the competition is contested between the 12 teams of the Guinness Premiership and the four Welsh regions from the Celtic League. The 16 teams are arranged into four pools, with one Welsh and three English teams in each. Teams are randomly drawn into groups, as opposed to previous years when English sides were grouped according to proximity to one another. Each team plays the other team from their group only once, meaning that two teams in each group face two away games, whereas the other two teams have two home games.

Group stage
In the pool matches, teams receive:
 Four points for a win
 Two points for a draw
 A bonus point for scoring four or more tries, regardless of the match result
 A bonus point for losing by seven or fewer points

The winner of each pool advances to the semi-finals, at which stage a draw takes place to determine the teams that will play each other. The winners of the semi-final advance to the final to determine the competition winner; no "third place final" is played.

Group A

Group B

Group C

Group D

Knockout stage

Semi-finals

Final

See also 
2007–08 English Premiership (rugby union)
2007–08 Celtic League

External links
 EDF Energy Cup Homepage

2007–08 in Welsh rugby union
2007–08 English Premiership (rugby union)
2007-08